The 1908–09 Scottish Division Two was won by Abercorn, with Arthurlie finishing bottom.

Table

References 

 Scottish Football Archive

Scottish Division Two seasons
2